The Oratory of Caballero de Gracia (Spanish: Oratorio del Caballero de Gracia) is a neoclassical church (oratory) located in Madrid, Spain. It is named after Jacobo de Grattis who was known as the Caballero de Gracia.

Juan de Villanueva drew up plans for the reconstruction of an existing church.

The interior has a stained glass window by the firm Maumejean.

Conservation
The northern side of the building was reconstructed in the 20th century when the Gran Via was laid out. The architect was Carlos de Luque López. The facade on the Gran Via was later altered by
Javier Feduchi Benlliure.

The building has been given the heritage listing Bien de Interés Cultural and has been protected since 1956.

See also 
Catholic Church in Spain
List of oldest church buildings

References 

Bien de Interés Cultural landmarks in Madrid
Roman Catholic churches in Madrid
18th-century Roman Catholic church buildings in Spain
Juan de Villanueva buildings
Neoclassical architecture in Madrid
Gran Vía (Madrid)
Buildings and structures in Sol neighborhood, Madrid
Neoclassical church buildings in Spain